Jalan Tiang Dua (Malacca state route M109) is a major road in Malacca state, Malaysia.

List of junctions 

Roads in Malacca